E. Travis York, Jr. (July 4, 1922 – April 15, 2011) was an American agronomist, professor, university administrator, agricultural extension administrator, and U.S. presidential adviser.  York was a native of Alabama, and earned his bachelor's, master's and doctorate degrees in agricultural sciences.  He served as the director of the Alabama Cooperative Extension Service, the administrator of the federal Extension Service, the interim president of the University of Florida, and the chancellor of the State University System of Florida.

Early life and education 

York was born and raised in the Valley Head community in DeKalb County in northeast Alabama, and came of age during the Great Depression.  After graduating from high school in 1939, York enrolled at Alabama Polytechnic Institute (API) (now Auburn University) in Auburn, Alabama, and earned his Bachelor of Science degree in agricultural science in 1942.  After completing his World War II service as a captain in the U.S. Army field artillery, York returned to API to continue his education in soil science.  During this time, he met and married Vermelle "Vam" Cardwell of Evergreen, Alabama, a business administration undergraduate and president of the API Women's Student Government Association.

York graduated from API with a Master of Science degree in agronomy and soils in 1946, and was accepted into the doctoral program at Cornell University in Ithaca, New York.  At Cornell, he studied under nationally renowned soil scientist Richard Bradfield, who imparted to York his passionate interest in how food shortages contributed to chronic hunger in much of the developing world.  Much of York's later career would focus on ways to harness the resources of the U.S. land-grant educational system to alleviate world hunger.

After finishing his doctor of philosophy degree at Cornell, York was hired as an associate professor of agronomy at North Carolina State University in Raleigh, North Carolina, where he would later assume the chairmanship of the Department of Agronomy.  In 1956, he left North Carolina State to work as a regional director for the Potash Institute.

Extension service 

In 1959, York returned to his alma mater to succeed the retiring P. O. Davis as director of the Alabama Cooperative Extension Service in Auburn, Alabama.  York remains the youngest person to serve as Alabama Extension director.

York's two-year tenure as extension director, though brief, was considered a watershed event in Alabama Extension history, reflected in the laudatory remarks in contemporary Alabama newspapers, including the Andalusia Star-News, which described his brief directorship as "a new and enlightened era" in Alabama farming.  York's vision of the Alabama Extension was that of an organization committed to the economic betterment of the state as a whole, rather than only to the farming sector or to urban Alabamians with lawn and gardening problems.

He was a vocal supporter of cooperation with other groups, calling on extension educators to "make these other groups members of our own team rather than [to] compete with them by attempting to do the total job by ourselves."  Perceiving the need for a highly trained and qualified staff, York developed a liberal study program to allow extension professionals to qualify for leave to pursue advanced degrees while earning full pay.  York also established a practice of replacing vacancies only with professionals with advanced degrees—a policy credited with greatly enhancing the quality of Alabama Extension programming.

York is remembered for ending the long-standing public perception that the Alabama Extension was hopelessly entangled in local, state and even national politics.  One of his earliest actions as the new Alabama Extension director was to remove the organization from partisan politics.  He invited the senior county extension agents to a dinner, all of whom had actively used their positions in state and local politics, and announced to his shocked audience that anyone who used his position for political gain or influence in the future would be summarily fired.

In 1961, at the request of U.S. Secretary of Agriculture Orville Freeman, York took a planned leave of absence as director of the Alabama Extension to serve as the administrator for the federal Extension Service (now the Cooperative State Research, Education and Extension Service) in Washington, D.C., and became the youngest person to ever hold the position.

University administrator 

Instead of returning to Auburn University as he originally planned, York accepted an offer to be the provost for agriculture at the University of Florida in Gainesville, Florida.  Later, he also served as the university's vice president for agricultural, natural and human resources, and its executive vice president.

During his tenure at Florida, he was credited with implementing far-reaching changes.  He was remembered for merging the College of Agricultural Life Sciences, the Florida Cooperative Extension Service, and the Florida Agricultural Experiment Station under the Institute of Food and Agricultural Sciences (IFAS) in 1964.  He established the Center for Tropical Agriculture, which extended IFAS' international influence, and initiated DARE (Developing Agricultural Resources Effectively), a long-range agricultural planning program.  York also founded SHARE (Special Help for Agricultural Research and Education), a University of Florida Foundation program that raises private funds for agricultural research.  Since its inception, SHARE has raised more than $169 million through monetary and in-kind gifts from thousands of donors.

Upon the resignation of university president Stephen C. O'Connell in 1973, York was named interim president of the University of Florida.  After Robert Q. Marston was chosen as his permanent successor in 1974, York was appointed chancellor of the State University System of Florida, serving from 1975 until 1980.

Legacy 

York retired from academia in 1980 to devote his full-time efforts to fighting global hunger, primarily by improving the agricultural infrastructure in developing countries.  He was appointed chairman of the Board for International Food and Agricultural Development (BIFAD) (a subagency of the Agency for International Development (AID)) by President Jimmy Carter, which works to strengthen and mobilize the resources of American land-grant universities to help Third World countries improve their agricultural industries through better educational and research institutions. He served in this position for three years and was succeeded by William E. Lavery. York also served as the chairman of the Board of the International Fertilizer Development Center, with sponsored programs around the world.

York authored more than 100 technical papers, journal articles and books, and lectured at more than forty universities in the United States and throughout the world.  He served as an adviser on sustainable agricultural development and famine relief to U.S. Presidents John F. Kennedy, Lyndon Baines Johnson, Richard M. Nixon, Gerald R. Ford, Jimmy Carter and Ronald Reagan.

Among his many life-time honors, York received honorary doctorates from Auburn, Florida, Ohio State and North Carolina State, and was a member of the Alabama Agricultural Hall of Honor and the Florida Agricultural Hall of Fame.  In 1997, the Museum of Florida History named York as a "Great Floridian," becoming one of the first twelve individuals honored for "shaping the state of Florida as we know it today."

Although York achieved his greatest academic stature at the University of Florida, he and his wife Vam remained loyal Auburn University alumni.  Dr. and Mrs. York contributed more than $1 million to Auburn, including a $300,000 planned gift to the College of Business; more than $600,000 to the E.T. and Vam York Endowed Fund for Excellence in International Agriculture to support worldwide experiences for faculty and graduate students; and $150,000 to establish the E.T. York Distinguished Lecturer Series, which draws national and international leaders in agriculture and related disciplines to deliver public addresses on the Auburn campus.

York died on April 15, 2011 in Gainesville; he was 88 years old.  He was survived by Vam, his wife of 64 years, and their son Travis and daughter Lisa.

See also 

 Florida Gators
 History of Alabama
 History of Auburn University
 History of Florida
 History of the University of Florida
 Land-grant university
 List of Auburn University people
 List of Cornell University alumni
 List of North Carolina State University people
 List of University of Florida faculty and administrators
 List of University of Florida presidents

References

Bibliography 

Pleasants, Julian M., Gator Tales: An Oral History of the University of Florida, University of Florida, Gainesville, Florida (2006).  .
Proctor, Samuel, & Wright Langley, Gator History: A Pictorial History of the University of Florida, South Star Publishing Company, Gainesville, Florida (1986).  .
Van Ness, Carl, & Kevin McCarthy, Honoring the Past, Shaping the Future: The University of Florida, 1853–2003, University of Florida, Gainesville, Florida (2003).
Yeager, Joe, & Gene Stevenson, Inside Ag Hill: The People and Events that Shaped Auburn's Agricultural History from 1872 through 1999, Sheridan Books, Chelsea, Michigan (1999).

External links 
 Alabama Cooperative Extension Service – Official website of the Alabama Cooperative Extension Service.
 Auburn University – Official website of Auburn University.
 Institute of Food and Agricultural Sciences – Official website of Institute of Food and Agricultural Sciences.
 Florida Board of Governors – Official website of the State University System of Florida.
 University of Florida – Official website of the University of Florida.
 York Lecturer Series – Official webpage of York Lecturer Series.

1922 births
2011 deaths
Alabama Cooperative Extension System
American agronomists
United States Army personnel of World War II
Auburn University alumni
Chancellors of the State University System of Florida
Cornell University alumni
Education in Alabama
People from DeKalb County, Alabama
Presidents of the University of Florida
United States Army officers